The  of the Japan Academy Prize is one of the annual Awards given by the Nippon Academy-sho association (Japan Academy Prize Association).

On 2020, Shim Eun-kyung, a South Korean, became the first non-Japanese actress to win this award.

List of winners

Multiple wins
The following individuals received multiple Best Actress awards:

External links
 Japan Academy Film Prize official website 
 The winner and nominees 

Outstanding Performance by an Actress in a Leading Role
Film awards for lead actress